Günter Neuburger (born 20 May 1954) is a West German bobsledder who competed in the early 1980s. He won a silver medal in the four-man event at the 1983 FIBT World Championships in Lake Placid, New York.

Neuberger also finished ninth in the four-man event at the 1984 Winter Olympics in Sarajevo.

References

External links
1984 bobsleigh four-man results
Bobsleigh four-man world championship medalists since 1930

Bobsledders at the 1984 Winter Olympics
German male bobsledders
Living people
1954 births
Olympic bobsledders of West Germany